Major-General Ouane Rattikone (Ouan Rathikoun), a Laotian senior military officer, was the commander-in-chief of the Royal Lao Armed Forces (French: Forces Armées du Royaume – FAR), the official military of the Royal Lao Government and the Kingdom of Laos, during the 1960s. He was born in 1912 in Luang Prabang.

An ally of the United States during the Vietnam War, Ouane developed a close relationship with William H. Sullivan, the U.S. ambassador to Laos, and Ted Shackley, the CIA station chief in Vientiane. Despite the intense conflicts amongst the FAR regional commanders, Ouane was pivotal in providing local military support against the North Vietnamese Army (NVA) and the Pathet Lao in the northern regions of Laos.

Ouane was also heavily involved in the trafficking of opium throughout Southeast Asia. Despite widespread conspiracy theories of CIA complicity in drug trafficking, an investigation by the U.S. Senate found no evidence of CIA involvement. In his memoirs, Shackley unapologetically stated that the CIA essentially turned a blind eye to the drug trafficking because their resources were already being sapped by the war in neighboring Vietnam. He is believed to have died in October 1978.

See also
1967 Opium War
Thao Ty
Thao Ma
Phoumi Nosavan
Vang Pao
Royal Lao Armed Forces
Laotian Civil War
Colonel Bounleuth Saycocie

Notes

Year of birth missing
1978 deaths
Laotian military leaders
Military personnel of the Vietnam War
Laotian anti-communists
People of the Laotian Civil War